Radio Sawa is a Middle Eastern radio station broadcasting in the Arab world. The station is a service of the Middle East Broadcasting Networks, Inc., which also operates Alhurra Television and is publicly funded by the U.S. Agency for Global Media and the U.S. Congress. The word "sawa" means "together" in many Arabic dialects.

Preexisting attitudes and concurrent reality of opinions towards the United States led to the creation of Radio Sawa. It seeks to effectively communicate with the youthful population of Arabic-speakers in the Middle East. The station's goal is to promote pro-American attitudes to youth in the Arab world. Radio Sawa's first broadcast was on March 23, 2002. Its newscasts are broadcast live on air from its studios in Washington, DC and Dubai, United Arab Emirates. Radio Sawa also has news bureaus and reporters throughout the Middle East.

History
Radio Sawa and its sister-network, Al Hurra TV, are part of a larger U.S. Public Diplomacy effort in the Middle East. Their stated mission is to "improve America's image in the Middle East and win the hearts and minds of the Arab people."

Radio Sawa was first launched on 23 March 2002, initially in Jordan, West Bank, Kuwait, UAE (Abu Dhabi), Qatar and Bahrain and eventually in the rest of the Arab World (see below for full list).

Radio Sawa replaced Voice of America's Arabic service, which had not been successful in attracting large audiences. The initiator of Radio Sawa is American media mogul Norman Pattiz. He found that more than 60% of the Arab population was under the age of 30, which is why he decided to develop programming that would target the younger generation. Pattiz believed that the best way to reach the young people was with music. This is why the majority of the radio's programming consists of American and Arab pop music.

Radio Sawa is controlled by the Broadcasting Board of Governors (BBG), the Federal agency responsible for all U.S. international civilian broadcasting. The BBG founded the Middle East Broadcasting Networks (MBN), a non-profit news and information organization, to run Radio Sawa and Al Hurra TV.

Funding
Radio Sawa is a United States Congress-funded public relations endeavor.

Programming
In contrast to the Voice of America radio broadcasts in the region which it replaced, Radio Sawa blends news with contemporary music, arts and lifestyle and other light programming. Radio Sawa's programming consists of roughly 20–25% news and 75–80% pop songs.

News
Apart from songs, most other content is presented in the rubric "The World Now," which includes news, interviews, sports, etc.

Songs
The station's playlist includes popular Arabic (Middle Eastern), English (mostly American hits) and Spanish (mostly Latin American) songs so as to attract the Arabic listener.

Special programming
There are also occasional specials.

Reception

Radio Sawa has been subject to criticism from various observers, who question its effectiveness in conveying America's message to the Arab world. Radio Sawa is commonly seen as terms of a solution to public relations crisis during the time of its launch as a form of public diplomacy, 'suggesting by implication that American media efforts do have the power to transform opinion if only implemented in a different form'.

Arab World
A study published in 2006, which surveyed college students at universities in five Arab countries, found that the students' attitudes towards U.S. foreign policy had actually worsened since they started listening to Radio Sawa and watching Al Hurra TV

Radio Sawa has also been criticized for its poor quality control and for its resistance to any outside review of its programming.

United States
A 2004 draft report prepared by the State Department's inspector general was severely critical of the station. Experts cited in the report concluded that "Radio Sawa failed to present America to its audience."

The station's emphasis on popular music has led critics to question if music alone is enough to convey America's message. Some critics point out that what matters is "not just how many people are tuning in, but how many people are affected by a broadcast's content."

Transmission
Radio Sawa is broadcast free across the region, using a combination of:
 2002-2019 Medium wave (AM) transmitters 
 FM transmitters
 Digital audio satellite broadcasting (Eutelsat, Nilesat, Arabsat)
 Online internet streaming (also accessible from its apps)

Alongside the mainstream Radio Sawa broadcasts, there are various regional streams targeted to specific regions/countries which are also available online:
 Radio Sawa
 Radio Sawa Iraq
 Radio Sawa Sudan

FM transmissions
Names of the cities next to them the broadcast frequency of FM in MHz.

 Amman – 98.1
 Ajloun - 107.4
 Ramallah - 94.2
 Nablus - 94.5
 Khalil - 100.2
 Jinin - 93.5
 West Bank - 98.1
 Gaza - 100.2
 Lebanon - 99.7
 Iraq - 100.5
 Khartoum - 97.5

Former AM transmissions
 The Cape Greco transmitter on Medium Wave to Egypt and the Levant – 990 kHz, formerly 891 kHz
 Iraq and The Persian Gulf – 1548 kHz
 Iraq – 1593 kHz
 Sudan and Yemen – 1431 kHz

See also
 Radio Farda, targeting Iran
 Alhurra
 Press TV
 IRIB World Service
 Al Jazeera
 CCTV International Arabic
 Rusiya Al-Yaum (روسيا اليوم)
 Al Mayadeen (الميادين)
 France 24 (Monte Carlo Doualiya)

References

External links
 Radio Sawa description in English
 

Radio stations established in 2002
International broadcasters
2002 establishments in the United Arab Emirates
Arabic-language radio stations
State media